This is a list of all tornadoes that were confirmed by local offices of the National Weather Service in the United States in April and May 2016.

United States yearly total

April

April 1 event

April 6 event

April 7 event

April 11 event

April 15 event

April 16 event

April 17 event

April 18 event

April 19 event

April 22 event

April 24 event

April 25 event

April 26 event

April 27 event

April 28 event

April 29 event

April 30 event

May

May 1 event

May 5 event

May 7 event

May 8 event

May 9 event

May 10 event

May 11 event

May 16 event

May 17 event

May 19 event

May 20 event

May 21 event

May 22 event

May 23 event

May 24 event

May 25 event

May 26 event

May 27 event

May 28 event

May 29 event

May 30 event

May 31 event

See also
 Tornadoes of 2016
 List of United States tornadoes from January to March 2016
 List of United States tornadoes from June to August 2016

Notes

References

Tornadoes of 2016
2016 natural disasters in the United States
2016, 04
April 2016 events in the United States
May 2016 events in the United States